Garvald is a hamlet on the B7007, near Dewar, by the Dewar Burn, in the Moorfoot Hills, in the Scottish Borders area of Scotland, in the former Peeblesshire.

Places nearby include Borthwick Hall, Heriot, the Leithen Water, Peatrig Hill, and Peebles.

See also
Garvald, East Lothian
Garvald, South Lanarkshire
List of places in the Scottish Borders
List of places in Scotland

References

 Barrowman, C (1997) 'Garvald Burn (Linton parish), chert scatter'.
 Barrowman, C (2000), 'Garvald Burn, Scottish Borders (Garvald parish), late Mesolithic chert scatter and knapping floor'.

External links

RCAHMS record of Garvald Burn

Geograph image: Railway shed, Garvald, with view of Heriot Water

Villages in the Scottish Borders